Huis te Warmelo was a Dutch frigate that struck rocks and sank in the Gulf of Finland near the Kalbådagrund lighthouse off the coast of Porvoo, Finland with the loss of all 130 crew on board.

Construction 
Huis te Warmelo was built in Medemblik, The Netherlands by Blauwevlag, Cornelis Willemszoon in 1708 as a war ship for the Admiralty of the Noorderkwartier. It was equipped with 3 masts and 40-44 cannons.

Sinking 
On 25 August 1715 Huis te Warmelo was on a voyage with 130 crew on board and equipped with 40-44 cannons, when it struck the submerged rocks Nannings Rutzen in the Gulf of Finland near the Kalbådagrund lighthouse off the coast of Porvoo, Finland and was taking on water rapidly before it sank when it reached deeper waters. All 130 crew members lost their lives in the disaster and the Dutch navy marked a cross on a map on the location of the sinking with the inscription: Hier is het Noord-Hollands oorlogschip op gebleven 1715 ("Here is where the North-Hollands war ship stayed 1715").

Wreck 
It was in a perfect state and laid upright on the sea floor. Even a part of one of the 3 masts was still standing and some cannons were still in position on the wooden deck. The wreck is so well preserved because of the environment with mainly the low salinity, cold temperatures and little oxygen in the water at this depth playing a part in making sure the wooden hull of the ship stayed in good condition.

The ship was only identified in 2015 after a historian found the map on which the Dutch navy had marked the wreck site and it was discovered that only one Dutch war ship had sunk that year, the Huis te Warmelo. The ship hit media attention in March 2016 when it was revealed that the unknown ship had a name and in what condition it was found in. She is the best preserved Dutch Navy ship found to this day and further investigation will be done on the wreck.

References

Sailing ships of the Netherlands
1700s ships
Shipwrecks in the Gulf of Finland
Ships built in the Netherlands
Ships of the Netherlands
Frigates of the Netherlands
Ships lost with all hands
Maritime incidents in 1715